Cryptoforis is a genus of Australian armored trapdoor spiders. It was first described by J. D. Wilson, Robert Raven and Günter E. W. Schmidt in 2020, and it has only been found in Australia.

Species
 it contains eighteen species:
C. absona Wilson, Raven & Rix, 2021 – Australia (New South Wales)
C. arenaria Wilson, Raven & Rix, 2021 – Australia (Queensland)
C. cairncross Wilson, Raven & Rix, 2021 – Australia (Queensland)
C. cassisi Wilson, Raven & Rix, 2021 – Australia (New South Wales)
C. celata Wilson, Raven & Rix, 2021 – Australia (New South Wales)
C. cooloola Wilson, Raven & Rix, 2021 – Australia (Queensland)
C. fallax Wilson, Raven & Rix, 2021 – Australia (New South Wales)
C. grayi Wilson, Raven & Rix, 2021 – Australia (New South Wales)
C. hickmani Wilson, Raven & Rix, 2021 – Australia (Tasmania)
C. hughesae Wilson, Rix & Raven, 2020 (type) – Australia (Queensland)
C. mainae Wilson, Raven & Rix, 2021 – Australia (Queensland, New South Wales)
C. montana Wilson, Raven & Rix, 2021 – Australia (Queensland)
C. monteithi Wilson, Raven & Rix, 2021 – Australia (Queensland)
C. tasmanica (Hickman, 1928) – Australia (Tasmania)
C. victoriensis (Main, 1995) – Australia (Victoria)
C. woondum Wilson, Raven & Rix, 2021 – Australia (Queensland)
C. xenophila Wilson, Raven & Rix, 2021 – Australia (Tasmania)
C. zophera Wilson, Raven & Rix, 2021 – Australia (Victoria)

See also
 Arbanitis
 Euoplos
 List of Idiopidae species

References

Further reading

Idiopidae genera
Spiders of Australia